Petras Giniotas (born 2 December 1952) is a Lithuanian politician. In 1990, he was among those who signed the Act of the Re-Establishment of the State of Lithuania.

See also
Politics of Lithuania

References

External links
 Biography 

1952 births
Living people
Members of the Seimas
Place of birth missing (living people)
Signatories of the Act of the Re-Establishment of the State of Lithuania
20th-century Lithuanian politicians